Thierry M. Luescher is a South African-Swiss author and researcher at the Human Sciences Research Council and affiliated professor at the University of the Free State.

Early life 
Thierry Luescher was born in Zofingen, Switzerland, in 1971, grew up in Oberentfelden and Muhen, and moved to South Africa in 1995 to study African languages, African history and political science at the University of Cape Town (B.A. 1999; PhD, 2009).

Early politics 
During his formative years, Luescher's mother and father were both involved in local politics and members of the Social-Democratic Party of Switzerland. In 1989, Luescher became involved in activist youth politics as a member of the LGBTI advocacy group HAZ in Zurich and gave interviews and made several appearances on Swiss television on the HIV/Aids pandemic then raging through Switzerland's gay community. He was a member of the first Youth Session of the Swiss Parliament in 1991, as a representative of the national organisation "Initiative Lesbisch/Schwule Jugend Schweiz (ILSJS)". After relocating to South Africa in 1995, he became a member of Abigail (the Cape Town-based Association of Bisexuals, Gays and Lesbians) where he met a number of gay anti-apartheid activists, including Zaki Achmat who later founded the Treatment Action Campaign.

Student politics and public mandate 
While studying at the University of Cape Town, Luescher became a member of the South African Students Congress which deployed him to stand as candidate for the university's Students' Representative Council (SRC) in 1999. He was SRC Vice-President from 1999 to 2000 and a member of the national executive committee of the South African Union of Students (then SAU-SRC) in 2001.

In 2019, Luescher was a surprise candidate for the national election to the Swiss National Council on the international list of the Social-Democratic Party of the canton of Fribourg, Switzerland.

Career 
Luescher started a career in research into higher education politics as the first researcher of the statutory South African advisory body to the Minister of Higher Education, the Council on Higher Education (2002-2008). He was a postdoctoral fellow (2009-2012) and senior lecturer (2012-2014) in Higher Education Studies at the University of the Western Cape. In 2014, Luescher moved to the University of the Free State in Bloemfontein/Mangaung to take up the post of assistant director for institutional research (2014-2017). During that time, he also added to his PhD in Political Science from UCT a postgraduate diploma in higher education teaching and learning. In 2017, he was called to take up the post of research director for higher education in the Human Sciences Research Council.

Luescher has held additional honorary academic appointments, including as extra-ordinary senior lecturer in political studies with the Department of Political Science, University of the Western Cape (2011-2015), and as affiliated associate professor in higher education studies with the School of Higher Education Studies, University of the Free State (2017 to present).

He is a founder and trustee of the South Africa-based open access academic publisher African Minds; a founder and editor of the Journal of Student Affairs in Africa (2013 to present) which is published with Stellenbosch University; an associate editor of the series African Higher Education Dynamics since 2015; and an international associate editor of the Ugandan Makerere Journal of Higher Education and the US Journal of College Student Development.

Luescher has authored or co-authored more than 50 journal articles, book chapters and books on topics closely linked to the nexus of higher education and politics in Africa. Some of his main topics include the representation of students in university decision-making, student activism and student movements, the student experience of higher education, university governance, higher education expansion and development in Africa, and the contribution of higher education to democracy and social justice in Africa.

Luescher's contribution to the study of student politics in Africa has been recognized internationally and in South Africa. In 2018 he was awarded a research rating by the National Research Foundation of South Africa as "currently the most published author on student politics in Africa". Luescher is also considered an expert on Philip Altbach's body of work on student activism, which he has synthesized as contributions to several books on international student politics.

References 

1971 births
Living people
South African male writers
South African political scientists
Swiss emigrants to South Africa
University of Cape Town alumni